The Indang–Alfonso Road is a , two-to-five lane, tertiary road that connects the municipalities of Indang and Alfonso in Cavite, Philippines.

Alternative names 
At the poblacion of Indang and Alfonso, the road has local alternative names. In Indang, it locally known as R. Jeciel, A. Mabini, J. Dimabiling, and Binambangan Streets, while in Alfonso, it is locally known as Avinante Road and Mabini Street, respectively. Its section between the Alfonso poblacion and Tagaytay–Nasugbu Highway is also known as Luksuhin–Mangas Road and Mangas–Alfonso Road.

Intersections

References

External links 
 Department of Public Works and Highways

Roads in Cavite